Shahar (English: "City") is a Kazakh language newspaper published from Kazakhstan, Pavlodar.

See also 
Media of Kazakhstan
List of newspapers in Kazakhstan

References

External links 
pavlodar-online.kz

2007 establishments in Kazakhstan
Publications established in 2007
Newspapers published in Kazakhstan
Kazakh-language newspapers
Mass media in Pavlodar